Peringara is a " panchayat" village in Thiruvalla Taluk of  Pathanamthitta district in the state of Kerala, in India. It lies at a distance of around 4 kilometres from Thiruvalla SCS Junction.It is Part Of Thiruvalla Sub-District & Comes Under Thiruvalla Constituency .

Administration 
The village is administered by a gram panchayat.

Important places 

Chathenkary
Mepral
Azhiyidathuchira

Education 

Government Higher Secondary School, Peringara
PMV High School, SNDPHS Chathankery
Government LPS Chathankery
Government New LPS Chathankery
Government St. John's UPS Mepral
Government St. John's LPS Mepral
Government LPS Mepral
MTLP School Vengal
Government LPS Alamthuruthy
Government LPS Ezhinjillam 
PMV LPS, PMV TTI

Religious places 
 Yammarkulangara Sree Mahaganapathi Temple
 Koottummel Bhagavathi Temple
 Puthukkulangaraara Temple
 India Pentecostal Church of God
 The Pentecostal Mission 
 St. George Orthodox Church
 Malankara Catholic Church Peringara, Karakkal

References

Villages in Pathanamthitta district
Villages in Thiruvalla taluk